Northfork is a town in McDowell County, West Virginia, United States, located on U.S. Route 52 between Welch and Bluefield.

The population was 231 at the 2020 census. Northfork was incorporated in 1901, so named because of its location on the north fork of the Elkhorn Creek at its junction with the south fork. It was consolidated with the town of Clark on March 26, 1948.

Geography
The town is on the Norfolk Southern Railway (former Norfolk and Western) network.

Demographics

2010 census
At the 2010 census there were 429 people, 173 households, and 108 families living in the town. The racial makeup of the town was 42.2% White, 57.1% African American, 0.2% Native American, and 0.5% from two or more races. Hispanic or Latino of any race were 0.2%.

Of the 173 households 26.0% had children under the age of 18 living with them, 33.5% were married couples living together, 21.4% had a female householder with no husband present, 7.5% had a male householder with no wife present, and 37.6% were non-families. 36.4% of households were one person and 16.8% were one person aged 65 or older. The average household size was 2.48 and the average family size was 3.24.

The median age in the town was 46.3 years. 23.1% of residents were under the age of 18; 5.2% were between the ages of 18 and 24; 20.6% were from 25 to 44; 33.6% were from 45 to 64; and 17.7% were 65 or older. The gender makeup of the town was 47.6% male and 52.4% female.

2000 census
At the 2000 census there were 519 people, 229 households, and 130 families living in the town. The racial makeup of the town was 44.12% White, 53.95% African American, 0.19% Native American, and 1.73% from two or more races. Hispanic or Latino of any race were 0.39%.

Of the 229 households 21.8% had children under the age of 18 living with them, 29.3% were married couples living together, 24.9% had a female householder with no husband present, and 42.8% were non-families. 38.9% of households were one person and 20.1% were one person aged 65 or older. The average household size was 2.24 and the average family size was 3.03.

The age distribution was 22.5% under the age of 18, 8.1% from 18 to 24, 22.0% from 25 to 44, 23.3% from 45 to 64, and 24.1% 65 or older. The median age was 43 years. For every 100 females, there were 79.0 males. For every 100 females age 18 and over, there were 69.6 males.

The median household income was $16,544 and the median family income  was $19,236. Males had a median income of $27,917 versus $20,781 for females. The per capita income for the town was $10,001. About 31.3% of families and 34.4% of the population were below the poverty line, including 52.6% of those under age 18 and 20.9% of those age 65 or over.

Notable people
 Charlie Manuel, MLB baseball manager
 Tom Beasley - Washington Redskins

References

Towns in McDowell County, West Virginia
Towns in West Virginia